Dicentrarchus is a genus of temperate basses native to the eastern Atlantic Ocean and the Mediterranean Sea.

Species
Currently, the two species in this genus are:

References

 
Moronidae